Hanging Glacier is a located northeast of Mount Anderson in the Olympic Mountains and Olympic National Park, U.S. state of Washington. Like all the glaciers in Olympic National Park, Hanging Glacier is in a state of retreat.

See also
List of glaciers in the United States

References

Glaciers of the Olympic Mountains
Glaciers of Jefferson County, Washington
Glaciers of Washington (state)